Robert "Bob" Wylie (born February 16, 1951) is an American football coach who is currently the offensive line coach for the Vegas Vipers of the XFL. Prior to this, he served as the offensive line coach for the Ottawa Redblacks of the Canadian Football League (CFL). He served as the offensive line coach for the Oakland Raiders and the Cleveland Browns of the National Football League (NFL), both under head coach Hue Jackson. He also held the same position for the Winnipeg Blue Bombers and the Saskatchewan Roughriders of the CFL.

Coaching career

Saskatchewan Roughriders
On March 16, 2009, Wylie was named the offensive line coach of the Saskatchewan Roughriders. The Roughriders went 10–7 in 2009 and made the playoffs. They would go on to lose the 97th Grey Cup to the Montreal Alouettes 27–28. Under his coaching center Jeremy O'Day, and guard Gene Makowsky were named CFL All-Stars.

Denver Broncos
On January 22, 2010, Wylie was named an assistant offensive line coach for the Denver Broncos. The Broncos went 4–12 in 2010 and missed the playoffs. Head coach Josh McDaniels was fired during the season and Wylie was let go.

Oakland Raiders

On January 31, 2011, Wylie was named the offensive line coach for the Oakland Raiders. The Raiders went 8–8 in 2011 and missed the playoffs. Under his coaching, guard Stefen Wisniewski was named All-Rookie. When head coach Hue Jackson was fired at the end of the season, he was let go.

Winnipeg Blue Bombers (second stint)
On April 1, 2014, Wylie was named the offensive line coach for the Winnipeg Blue Bombers. During the 2014 season, the Blue Bombers went 7-11 and missed the playoffs.

At the end of the 2015 season the Bombers went 5–13 and missed the playoffs.

During his final season in Winnipeg, the 2016 Blue Bombers went 11–7 making the playoffs for the first time since 2011. They would go on to lose in the semi-final 32–31 to the BC Lions. Under his coaching, guard Travis Bond was named a CFL All-Star as well as an All-Division selection. After this season, Wylie left the CFL for the NFL.

Cleveland Browns
On January 19, 2017, Wylie was hired by the Cleveland Browns. During the 2017 season, the Browns went 0–16, as of 2022 the 2017 Cleveland Browns and the 2008 Detroit Lions are the only teams to go 0-16 in a season.

In 2018, Wylie was featured on HBO's Hard Knocks with the Browns, a television series produced by NFL Films. He was made famous after a video of him yelling "set hut" went viral, and was also well received after he compared the stance and athleticism of offensive linemen to that of a gorilla. Wylie was adamant that long periods of stretching were not truly beneficial to football players. That year, the Browns went 7–8–1 and missed the playoffs.

On January 9, 2019 Wylie's contract was not renewed by the Browns.

Ottawa Redblacks
On December 12, 2019, Wylie was hired by the Ottawa Redblacks as the offensive line coach. After the 2020 CFL season was cancelled, Wylie coached for the Redblacks in 2021. He was not retained by the team for the 2022 season.

Vegas Vipers
Coach Rod Woodson of the Vegas Vipers hired Wylie as an assistant for the 2023 season.

References

External links
 Winnipeg Blue Bombers bio

1951 births
Living people
American football offensive linemen
Chicago Bears coaches
New York Jets coaches
Oakland Raiders coaches
Winnipeg Blue Bombers coaches
Cleveland Browns coaches
Ottawa Redblacks coaches
Saskatchewan Roughriders coaches
Syracuse Orange football coaches
Arizona Cardinals coaches
Cincinnati Bengals coaches
Cincinnati Bearcats football coaches
Tampa Bay Buccaneers coaches
Colorado State Rams football coaches
Ohio Bobcats football coaches
Holy Cross Crusaders football coaches
Brown Bears football coaches
Roger Williams University alumni
Colorado Buffaloes football coaches
Players of American football from Rhode Island
People from West Warwick, Rhode Island
West Warwick High School alumni